West Clark Community Schools is a school district serving students in the western half of Clark County, Indiana. It consists of three schools, Silver Creek High School, William W. Borden High School, and Henryville jr/sr High School. Its superintendent is Clemen Perez-Lloyd.

See also 
 Hendren v. Campbell: a 1977 court case on the district's adoption of a creationist textbook

External links
West Clark Community Schools website

School districts in Indiana
Education in Clark County, Indiana
Schools in Clark County, Indiana